The 2003 King's Lynn and West Norfolk Borough Council election took place on 1 May 2003 to elect members of King's Lynn and West Norfolk Borough Council in England. This was on the same day as other local elections.

Election result

|}

References

2003 English local elections
May 2003 events in the United Kingdom
2003
2000s in Norfolk